Shortite is a sodium-calcium carbonate mineral, with the chemical formula Na2Ca2(CO3)3. It was discovered by J. J. Fahey in well cuttings from the Green River Formation, Sweetwater County, Wyoming, US, and was named to honor Maxwell N. Short (1889–1952), Professor of Mineralogy, University of Arizona.

Shortite is associated with commercial trona ores, and some care must be taken when beneficiating crude trona to avoid contamination with shortite.

See also 
 Aragonite
 Calcite
 Nahcolite
 Natron
 Sodium sesquicarbonate
 Thermonatrite
 Trona
 Vaterite

References

Mindata, with localities
Shortite data

Calcium minerals
Carbonate minerals
Sodium minerals
Orthorhombic minerals
Minerals in space group 38